Ivan Radoev (9 September 1901 – 4 August 1985) was a Bulgarian footballer. He competed in the men's tournament at the 1924 Summer Olympics.

Honours
Player
Levski Sofia
 Sofia Championship: 1923, 1924, 1925
 Ulpia Serdika Cup: 1926

Coach
Levski Sofia
 Bulgarian A PFG: 1946, 1947, 1950
 Bulgarian Cup: 1946, 1947, 1950
 Sofia Championship: 1945, 1946, 1948

Bulgaria
 1947 Balkan Cup: Fourth place

References

1901 births
1985 deaths
Bulgarian footballers
Bulgaria international footballers
Olympic footballers of Bulgaria
Footballers at the 1924 Summer Olympics
Footballers from Sofia
Association football defenders
PFC Levski Sofia players